The 1935 Louisville Cardinals football team was an American football team that represented the University of Louisville as a member of the Southern Intercollegiate Athletic Association (SIAA) during the 1935 college football season. In their third and final season under head coach Ben Cregor, the Cardinals compiled a 1–6–1 record.

Schedule

References

Louisville
Louisville Cardinals football seasons
Louisville Cardinals football